Borivoje "Bora" Grbić (born January 21, 1972, in Belgrade) is a Serbian comic-book and graphic novel creator, known best for his comics "Faktor 4" (written by Milan Konjević), "Munja" (written by Zoran Stefanović and Zdravko Zupan), "Mobijeva kopilad"  (written by Bojan Milojević - "Asterian") and other comics for "Šlic" magazine, as well as "Vekovnici" (written by Marko Stojanović).

He is co-founder and the general secretary of the Association of Serbian comics artists (Serbian: Udruženje stripskih umetnika Srbije).

He was the bassist of the Belgrade rock bands "Viborg Dallas and "Vien lur" (formerly the "Delta 99"), now playing in "Dekoder".

References

External links
 Borivoje Grbić, Studio S.O.K.O., Beograd (Serbian)
 "Interview with Borivoje Grbic: Storyboards of Martian troubadour" (Intervju sa Borivojem Grbićem: Storibord marsovca trubadura), Association for production and promotion of comic books, Novi Sad (Serbian)
 "Association of comic artists in Serbia started its regular work: A new era for comics professionals in Serbia" (Udruženje stripskih umetnika Srbije počelo sa redovnim radom: Novo doba za stripske profesionalce u Srbiji), "Strip vesti", 25.7. 2011. (Serbian)
 

1972 births
Living people
Artists from Belgrade
Serbian comics artists
Serbian comics writers
Serbian illustrators
Serbian bass guitarists
21st-century bass guitarists
Musicians from Belgrade